You Know That I Love You may refer to:

 "You Know That I Love You" (Christie Allen song), 1978 
 "You Know That I Love You" (Santana song), 1979 
 "You Know That I Love You" (Donell Jones song), 2002